Margaret H. Woodward (born 1960) is an American former military officer and major general in the United States Air Force.

As commander of the 17th Air Force and U.S. Air Forces Africa, Ramstein Air Base, Germany, she was responsible for all US air actions that involved Africa. In March 2011, she commanded the air component of the US contribution to the no-fly zone over Libya, sanctioned by the United Nations, making her the first woman to oversee a U.S. combat air campaign.

She retired on April 1, 2014.

Early life and education
Woodward was born in 1960 and grew up in India and Pakistan, where her father worked for the United States Agency for International Development. She left the region when she was about ten years old.

Career
In 1982, Woodward graduated from the Arizona State University and joined the U.S. Air Force the year after. For most of her career she flew aerial refueling aircraft such as the Boeing KC-135 Stratotanker, though she also has experience in the Boeing C-40 Clipper, the C-37 military version of the Gulfstream G550, and the T-37 and T-38 trainers. She was involved the U.S. invasion of Panama, Operation Allied Force, Operations Northern and Southern Watch, Operation Enduring Freedom and missions during the Iraq War.

In 2007, she became commander of the 89th Airlift Wing, which includes responsibility for Air Force One, and in June 2010 became commander of the Seventeenth Air Force, the U.S. Air Force branch of the United States Africa Command. As such, she was the operational commander for the U.S. involvement in the 2011 military intervention in Libya, dubbed Operation Odyssey Dawn, before command of the whole operation was transferred to NATO.

After handing over command of Seventeenth Air Force, she was posted Stateside. Her Air Force official profile lists her appointments since as:
 May 2012 - September 2012, Acting Director, Operational Planning, Policy & Strategy, Deputy Chief of Staff, Operations, Plans and Requirements, Headquarters U.S. Air Force, Washington, D.C.
 September 2012 - June 2013, Air Force Chief of Safety, Headquarters U.S. Air Force, Washington, D.C., and Commander, Air Force Safety Center, Kirtland AFB, N.M.
 June 2013 - mid 2014, Director, Air Force Sexual Assault Prevention and Response Office, Office of the Vice Chief of Staff, Headquarters U.S. Air Force, Washington, D.C. Retired mid 2014.

Education 
 1982: Bachelor of Science degree in aerospace engineering at the Arizona State University, Tempe
 1995: Air Command and Staff College, Air University at Maxwell Air Force Base
 1997: Master's degree in aviation science, Embry-Riddle Aeronautical University, Daytona Beach, Fla.
 2001: Master's degree in national security strategy, National War College in Fort Lesley J. McNair, Washington, D.C.

Awards and decorations

Promotions 
List of promotions Woodward has received during her career:

See also
 List of female United States military generals and flag officers

References

External links 

 US hands command of Libya air strategy to senior female officer (The Guardian)
 The new face of war: A female general commands the U.S. air campaign. (The Best Defense | Foreign Policy)
 Photo from Reuters Pictures (daylife.com)

1960 births
Living people
Female generals of the United States Air Force
Arizona State University alumni
Embry–Riddle Aeronautical University alumni
National War College alumni
People of the First Libyan Civil War
Women in 21st-century warfare
21st-century American women